Syed Sharf-Ud-Din Abdul Rehman Shah (Persian:سيٌد شرف الدٌين عبد الرٌَحمان شاه) popularly known as Bulbul Shah (Persian: بلبل شاه ) was a 14th-century Turkistani Sufi of Suhrawardi order. He introduced first Islam to Kashmir by inviting and converting the King of Kashmir, Rinchan Shah (later named to Sadruddin Shah) to Islam. He was from a Suhrawardi order and his mentor was Mir Syed Niymatullah who ordered him to on take Islamic missionary movement to Kashmir. Shah was mentioned by "Baba Dawood Mishkati" in Asrar-ul- Abrar and Rafi-ud- Din Nawadir-ul- Akhbar.

Shrine 
A shrine is dedicated to his burial place on the Jhelum river which was actually a Langar, a community kitchen. In 2011 the Archeological Survey of India rejected the proposal to make it a National Monument even after the High Court ordered the Survey to accept it. Petitioner GA Lone filed a contempt petition against the official respondents. The High Court directed the Jammu and Kashmir Chief Secretary, Director, Archives and others to file a compliance report.

See also 
Abdul Qadir Gilani
Mir Sayyid Ali Hamadani
Nund Rishi
Hamza Makhdoom
Baba Naseeb-ud-Din Ghazi

References

External links 

Turkish Sufis
Muslim missionaries
History of Kashmir
14th-century Indian Muslims
Sufism